Thomas McKee Bayne (June 14, 1836 – June 16, 1894) was an officer in the Union Army during the American Civil War, a lawyer, a district attorney, and a Republican member of the U.S. House of Representatives from Pennsylvania.

Bayne was born in Bellevue, Pennsylvania. He attended the public schools and Westminster College in New Wilmington, Pennsylvania. He studied law. During the American Civil War, he entered the Union Army in July 1862 as colonel of the 136th Pennsylvania Infantry.

He took part in the battles of Fredericksburg and Chancellorsville. He resumed the study of law in 1865, and was admitted to the bar of Allegheny County in April 1866. He was elected as district attorney for Allegheny County, Pennsylvania in October 1870 and held the office until January 1, 1874.

Bayne was an unsuccessful candidate for election in 1874. He was elected as a Republican to the Forty-fifth and to the six succeeding Congresses. He was renominated as a candidate for reelection to the Fifty-second Congress, but declined to accept the nomination, retiring from public life and active business pursuits.

While still a congressman, Bayne became the first editor and publisher of The Evening Penny Press, a newspaper later known as The Pittsburgh Press.

As a result of concerns about a lung hemorrhage, he shot himself dead, two days after his 58th birthday, in Washington, D.C. in 1894. He was interred in Union Dale Cemetery, Pittsburgh, Pennsylvania.

References

External links
 
 

1836 births
1894 deaths
People from Bellevue, Pennsylvania
Westminster College (Pennsylvania) alumni
Pennsylvania lawyers
American politicians who committed suicide
Union Army colonels
Suicides by firearm in Washington, D.C.
Republican Party members of the United States House of Representatives from Pennsylvania
19th-century American politicians
1890s suicides
19th-century American lawyers
Military personnel from Pennsylvania